The 2001–02 UCLA Bruins men's basketball team represented the University of California, Los Angeles in the 2001–02 NCAA Division I men's basketball season.  The team finished 6th in the conference and lost in the first round of the Pac-10 tournament to the California Golden Bears.  The Bruins competed in the 2002 NCAA Division I men's basketball tournament, losing to the Missouri Tigers in the sweet sixteen.

Roster

Starting lineup

Cedric Bozeman (Fr.), Point Guard

Billy Knight (Sr.), Shooting Guard

Jason Kapono (Jr.), Small Forward

Matt Barnes (Sr.), Power Forward

Dan Gadzuric (Sr.), Center

Bench
T. J. Cummings (So.)

Rico Hines (Sr.)

John Hoffart (So.)

Josiah Johnson (Fr.)

Andre Patterson (Fr.)

Dijon Thompson (Fr.)

Ryan Walcott (Fr.)

Awards And Honors

 Jason Kapono
 AP Honorable-Mention All-American 
 First-Team All-Pac-10 
 First-Team USBWA All-District 9. 
 First-Team NABC All-District 15.
 Naismith College Player of the Year Finalist 
 Team Co-Most Valuable Player
 Dan Gadzuric
 Honorable-Mention All-Pac-10
 Team Co-Most Valuable Player
 Cedric Bozeman
 Honorable-Mention Pac-10 All-Freshman Team
 Matt Barnes
 Second-Team NABC All-District 15.
 Team Co-Most Valuable Player
 Billy Knight
 Team Co-Most Valuable Player

Schedule

|-
!colspan=9 style=|Exhibition

|-
!colspan=9 style=|Regular Season

|-
!colspan=9 style=| Pacific-10 Tournament

|-
!colspan=9 style=| NCAA tournament

Source

References

UCLA Bruins
UCLA Bruins men's basketball seasons
NCAA
NCAA
Ucla